Magnus Persson (born 17 December 1990) is a Swedish handball player for HK Malmö and the Swedish national team.

References

1990 births
Living people
Swedish male handball players
HK Drott players
VfL Gummersbach players
21st-century Swedish people